Pete Townshend Live: Sadler's Wells 2000 is a live album released by Pete Townshend in 2000. Townshend presented the music from Lifehouse at two concerts at Sadler's Wells Theatre in London on February 25 and 26, 2000, supported by a number of musicians and vocalists and The London Chamber Orchestra. Musicians included Pete Townshend, Chucho Merchán, Phil Palmer, John "Rabbit" Bundrick, Peter Hope-Evans and Jody Linscott. Vocalists included Chyna, Cleveland Watkiss and Billy Nicholls. Violinist and orchestra leader Gaby Lester performed the violin solo on "Baba O'Riley". The live recording was issued on a CD album titled Pete Townshend Live: Sadler's Wells 2000 and a video/DVD titled Pete Townshend – Music from Lifehouse in 2002.

Track listing

References

Pete Townshend live albums